Charulata Mukherjee was a noted women's rights activist and social worker from Calcutta, who was associated with Brahmo Samaj and All India Women's Conference. She was noted for her social and women rights activism.  She was an active member of AIWC and worked with other contemporaries like Rajkumari Amrit Kaur, Rani Rajwade, Muthulakshmi Reddi, Hansa Mehta and others. At Bengal front, she worked along her daughter Renuka Ray and Romola Sinha, who were noted for their fight for abolition of Devdasi system, prostitution and rehabilitation of children of prostitutes.

She was daughter of Dr P. K. Roy and Sarala Roy. She was married to Satish Chandra Mukherjee. Air Marshal Subroto Mukerjee, Prosanto Mukherjee and Renuka Ray were her sons and daughter.

References

People from Kolkata
Indian activists
Indian women activists
Indian women's rights activists
Indian feminists
20th-century Indian women
20th-century Indian people
Bengali Hindus
Bengali activists
Bengali educators
20th-century Bengalis
Das family of Telirbagh
Brahmos
Year of death missing
Activists from West Bengal
Women educators from West Bengal
Social workers
Educators from West Bengal
Indian reformers
Indian social reformers
Indian social workers
Indian educators
Indian women educators
Indian educational theorists
Indian women educational theorists
Educationists from India
20th-century Indian educational theorists
20th-century Indian educators